The Saliva Tree is a science fiction novella by British writer Brian W. Aldiss  first published in the September 1965  issue of The Magazine of Fantasy and Science Fiction. It won the 1965 Nebula Award for Best Novella (which it shared with He Who Shapes by Roger Zelazny in a tie).

The Saliva Tree was written to mark the centenary of H. G. Wells's birth, and shared the Nebula Award for the best novella of 1965. While set in a Wellsian milieu, it contains two plot elements also found in the stories of H.P. Lovecraft: an object from space which causes crops and livestock to grow prolifically, but be unpalatable (The Colour out of Space) and a monster which is visible only when sprayed with an opaque powder (The Dunwich Horror).

References

External links 
 

1965 short stories  
Nebula Award for Best Novella-winning works 
Science fiction short stories
Works by Brian Aldiss
Works originally published in The Magazine of Fantasy & Science Fiction